Ross William Fichtner (October 26, 1938 – October 14, 2022) was an American football former cornerback in the NFL for the Cleveland Browns (1960 - 1967) and New Orleans Saints (1968).  He played college football at Purdue University where he succeeded Len Dawson as the starting quarterback; he twice led the Boilermakers in passing (1957 & 1958) & total offense (1957 & 1958).  He played in the Blue-Gray Game following the 1959 season. He is also the father of Randy Fichtner, who formerly served as the receivers coach, quarterbacks coach, and offensive coordinator for the Pittsburgh Steelers.

References

1938 births
2022 deaths
American football cornerbacks
Cleveland Browns players
New Orleans Saints players
Purdue Boilermakers football players
Sportspeople from McKeesport, Pennsylvania